Eryngium bourgatii, the Mediterranean sea holly, is a species of flowering plant in the family Apiaceae native to Morocco, Lebanon, Turkey, France, and Spain. The spherical blue flowerheads have spiny bracts.

The plant was named for a French medical doctor named Bourgat who collected plants in the Pyrenees in the company of Antoine Gouan, the author of the species, in 1766–67.

Numerous cultivars have been produced for garden use, of which 'Oxford Blue' has gained the Royal Horticultural Society's Award of Garden Merit.

References

bourgatii